Karin Mayr-Krifka (born 4 June 1971, in St. Valentin) is a retired Austrian sprinter who specialized in the 100 and 200 metres.

Competition record

Personal bests
100 metres - 11.15 s (2003)
200 metres - 22.70 s (2002)
Long jump - 6.31 m (2002)
4 x 100 metres relay - 44.63 seconds, national record

References

External links

1971 births
Living people
Austrian female sprinters
Athletes (track and field) at the 2000 Summer Olympics
Athletes (track and field) at the 2004 Summer Olympics
Olympic athletes of Austria
People from Amstetten District
World Athletics Indoor Championships medalists
Sportspeople from Lower Austria
Olympic female sprinters